Carmania may refer to:
 Carmania (region), an ancient satrapy of the Achaemenid Persian empire
 Alexandria Carmania, a former city in Carmania founded by Alexander the Great
 Kerman Province in the south-east of Iran
 RMS Carmania (1905), a Cunard liner built 1905
 RMS Carmania (1954), a Cunard liner, originally RMS Saxonia
 British Rail Class 40 diesel locomotive D218